Charles-Eugène Amable de Cadier de Veauce (21 February 1868 – 22 January 1934) was a member of French nobility and an equestrian.

Personal life
Cadier de Veauce was born in Paris on 21 February 1868, the eldest son of landowner and politician Charles Eugène de Cadier, Baron de Veauce and Jeanne de Wykersloot van Weerdesteyn. He was married twice, in 1892 to Claire de Riberolles, and in 1907 to Gertrude Mary Burton. He died in Clermont-Ferrand on 22 January 1934.

Equestrian
Cadier de Veauce competed in the equestrian mail coach event at the 1900 Summer Olympics.

References

1868 births
1934 deaths
French male equestrians
Olympic equestrians of France
Equestrians at the 1900 Summer Olympics
Sportspeople from Paris